Rama Ramanathan (born 1964) is an Indian politician from the All India Anna Dravida Munnetra Kazhagam who served as a Member of the Tamil Nadu Legislative Assembly for Kumbakonam from 1991 to 1996.He was a staunch loyalist of AIADMK Supremo J. Jayalalithaa. He even announced in public that he will only marry if J.Jayalalitha becomes chief minister and he becomes M.L.A. He contested and lost assembly elections from kumbakonam constituency under aiadmk ticket in 1996,2001,2006,2011 elections. In 2011 there were enormous chances for him to become minister but unfortunately he lost by a margin of 1000 votes to G.Anbalagan of DMK. 
He is Currently Kumbakonam Town Secretary of All India Anna Dravida Munnetra Kazhagam..

References 
 

1964 births
All India Anna Dravida Munnetra Kazhagam politicians
Living people
People from Thanjavur district